Tutsa is a Sino-Tibetan language spoken in northeastern India. Tutsa is spoken in southern Changlang district and eastern Tirap district of Arunachal Pradesh, as well as Tinsukia district of Assam (Ethnologue). Half of speakers are monolingual.

References

Languages of Assam
Languages of Arunachal Pradesh
Sal languages